MIPT can refer to:

 Moscow Institute of Physics and Technology
 National Memorial Institute for the Prevention of Terrorism
 MiPT, N-Methyl-N-isopropyltryptamine
 Male Iron Pipe Thread, see Gender of connectors and fasteners